Inception is the debut album by jazz pianist McCoy Tyner which was released on the Impulse! label in 1962. It features performances by Tyner with bassist Art Davis and drummer Elvin Jones.

Reception
The AllMusic review by Alexander Gelfand states that "this album gives listeners the chance to hear what a very young Tyner sounded like outside the confines of the classic John Coltrane quartet of the early '60s; it reveals a lyrical approach to jazz piano that seems a far cry from Tyner's mature style".

Background
"Blues for Gwen" was named after Tyner's sister, whilst "Sunset" was suggested by Tyner's wife, Aisha, because the piece "brought to her mind an impression of nature, and because it's a reflective ballad, "Sunset" seemed the logical title."

Track listing
All compositions by McCoy Tyner except as indicated
 "Inception" - 4:28
 "There Is No Greater Love" (Jones, Symes) - 6:21
 "Blues for Gwen" - 4:27
 "Sunset" - 4:41
 "Effendi" - 6:39
 "Speak Low" (Weill, Nash) - 6:18
Recorded on January 10 (#1, 4-5) and January 11 (#2-3, 6), 1962.

Personnel
McCoy Tyner - piano
Art Davis - bass
Elvin Jones - drums

References

External links
 2012 Review on All About Jazz

McCoy Tyner albums
1962 debut albums
Impulse! Records albums
Albums produced by Bob Thiele
Albums recorded at Van Gelder Studio